"Nobody but You" is a song by Austrian singer Cesár Sampson. The song represented Austria in the Eurovision Song Contest 2018. The song title was revealed to the public on 7 December 2017, and was composed by Sampson himself, Borislav Milanov and Sebastian Arman (both of the collective Symphonix International), and by Swedish songwriter Joacim Persson who has been involved in the composition of a number of songs for Bulgaria, notably Poli Genova's Eurovision 2016 entry "If Love Was a Crime" and in Kristian Kostov's Eurovision 2017 entry "Beautiful Mess" and by Swedish songwriter Johan Alkenäs. "Nobody but You" was released on 9 March 2018.

Eurovision Song Contest

Cesár Sampson was announced as the Austrian act for the 2018 contest on 5 December 2017, and the title of the song was revealed two days after. Austria competed as the 13th act in the first semi-final and qualified for the Grand Final on 12 May 2018. Following the semi-final, Austria was drawn to perform in the first half of the grand final. The song placed third overall, winning the jury vote but only ranking 13th with the televote.

Track listing

Charts

Release history

References

Eurovision songs of Austria
Eurovision songs of 2018
2018 songs
2018 debut singles
Songs written by Joacim Persson
Songs written by Johan Alkenäs
Gospel songs
Songs written by Borislav Milanov